Gunnar Josef Agaton Holmberg (6 May 1897 – 21 October 1975) was a Swedish association football who won a bronze medal at the 1924 Summer Olympics. He had a nickname bajadär (devadasi) because his footwork resembled an Indian dance.

References

External links

1897 births
1975 deaths
Swedish footballers
Footballers at the 1924 Summer Olympics
Olympic footballers of Sweden
Olympic bronze medalists for Sweden
Sweden international footballers
Olympic medalists in football
Medalists at the 1924 Summer Olympics
Association football midfielders
GAIS players
Footballers from Gothenburg